Deerhurst Resort in Huntsville, Ontario, is 215 km (133 Miles) north of Toronto in Ontario's Muskoka region, bordering the Algonquin Provincial Park.  The resort dates from 1896 when it was opened by English entrepreneur Charles Waterhouse.  The lakeside hotel was the central venue of the 36th G8 summit in 2010. A number of summer camps are located nearby.

Facility
Deerhurst offers accommodations for 1,000 people in 400 rooms and suites, many of which are privately owned or blocked by timeshares. Rates for suites overlooking Peninsula Lake can exceed $650 a night in peak summer season.

The career of singer Shania Twain took off when she was one of the performers at the resort.

History
Deerhurst was the first major resort on the northern lakes of Muskoka. In the early days, Deerhurst's lodge was accessible only by steamboat and the property encompassed only four acres of waterfront. In 1896, Deerhurst hosted two guests who paid $3.50 per person per week, three meals a day included.

Deerhurst is now run by Skyline International Developments and is under the flag of Skyline Hotels & Resorts. The Waterhouse financial interests in Deerhurst were sold in 1989.

36th G8 summit
The 36th G8 summit at Deerhurst held from June 25–26, 2010 was the fifth G8 Summit hosted by Canada since 1976.

Adventure Sports Destination
Deerhurst hosts a variety of high-profile outdoor sporting events, including golf tournaments, running and triathlon events like the new IronMan 70.3. For six years (2006-2012) Deerhurst hosted the Canadian Pond Hockey Championships on specialty-built rinks on Peninsula Lake.

Since 2005, Deerhurst has hosted adventure racing on the first weekend in May, organized by Frontier Adventure Sports & Training.  The Frontier Adventure Challenge is open to any adventurous athletes, while the High School Adventure Challenge is the first and only event of its kind in Canada purely for High School students.

Extensive wilderness on Deerhurst's property and surrounding the resort make it a popular base for adventure sports.

Golf
Deerhurst is home to two 18 hole golf courses, the Highlands and the Lakeside. Deerhurst Highlands is the larger of the two and was ranked as Score Golf's Best Resort Course in Ontario 2011 as well as #11 out of all public golf courses in Ontario in Score Golf's latest ranking. Lakeside is a smaller course in the heart of the resort, with a par of only 64.

See also
 Huntsville/Deerhurst Resort Airport - LID: CDH1
 Huntsville Water Aerodrome
 Huntsville/Bella Lake Water Aerodrome
 List of G8 summit resorts

Notes

References
 Paris, Jay, Carmi Zona-Paris and Tessa Scripps. (2006).  100 Best All-Inclusive Resorts of the World. Stonington, Connecticut: Globe Pequot Press.  (paper)

External links
 Deerhurst Resort:  Official website
 Huntsville Tourism: Official Site
 University of Toronto: G8 Information Centre

Hotels in Ontario
Resorts in Canada
Buildings and structures in the District Municipality of Muskoka
Tourist attractions in the District Municipality of Muskoka
Huntsville, Ontario